HMS Fantome was an 18-gun brig-sloop of the Royal Navy. She was originally a French privateer brig named Fantôme, which the British captured in 1810 and commissioned into British service. Fantome saw extensive action in the War of 1812 until she was lost in a shipwreck at Prospect, Nova Scotia, near Halifax in 1814.

Construction and French Service
Fantôme was built at St. Malo, France by the noted French privateer captain Robert Surcouf in 1809 as a privately owned corvette brig. On her first voyage the brig sailed to Isle de France (Mauritius) in the Indian Ocean as an armed transport with a license to attack enemy ships. Fantôme was pierced for 20 heavy carronades and carried a crew of 74 men. She made three captures. Fantôme took off dollars and goods, but then gave the brig up, which sailed on to Pernambuco.

Capture
The frigate  was in company with the sloop  when they captured Fantome in the mid Atlantic on the brig's return voyage from the Indian Ocean on 28 May 1810. The brig was taken to the Halifax Vice admiralty court and condemned in June 1810. The Royal Navy took her into service as HMS Fantome after a refit at the Halifax naval yard for conversion to British service. She was commissioned at Bermuda in 1811 under Commander John Lawrence.

Initial British service
She initially served on the North Sea station. On 12 November 1811 she sailed for Portugal. Fantome detained the Canton, Allen, master, and sent her into Lisbon where she arrived on 19 July 1812.

On 4 December 1812 Fantome sailed for North America.

War of 1812
Fantome was among the vessels in the squadron that captured the enemy vessels Gustavus and Staunch on 24 February. Similarly, she shared in the capture of Christiana (3 March) and Massasoit (14 March). However, prize money was not awarded until May 1818.

On 4 March 1813, Fantome captured and destroyed the American schooner Betsy Ann. She had been sailing from Alexandria to Boston with a cargo of flour. Fantome was among the vessels that shared in the proceeds of the capture of the General Knox on 17 March.

Operations in Chesapeake Bay 

On 3 April 1813 five enemy armed vessels were sighted in Chesapeake Bay off the Rappahannock River and Maidstone, Statira, Fantome, Mohawk and the tender  chased them into the river. Boats of the squadron, under the command of Lieutenant Puckingthorne of San Domingo, rowed 15 miles upriver, where they found four armed schooners drawn up in line. The Arab (7), was run ashore and boarded by two boats from Marlborough, while  San Domingos pinnace captured Lynx and Racer. Men from Statiras cutter and Maidstones launch captured . The attacking party lost two men killed and 11 wounded. Fantome had no casualties. A final distribution of headmoney for Lynx and Racer took place in February 1817.

Following the capture of the privateers, the squadron continued up the Chesapeake, and Admiral Warren ordered Rear Admiral George Cockburn to penetrate the rivers at the head of the bay, taking Maidstone, Fantome, Mohawk, Highflyer, and three of the captured schooners. Cockburn also had a detachment of 180 seamen and 200 marines from the squadron's naval brigade, together with a small detachment of  the Royal Artillery from Bermuda and under the command of Lieutenant Robertson.

On 28 April, when Cockburn learned of stores of flour and military equipment at French Town on the Elk River, he embarked in Fantome and took Mohawk, Dolphin, Racer and Highflyer up the river. At 11 p.m. 150 marines and five artillery men left in boats to destroy the stores, with Lieutenant Lewis following in Highflyer as support. Unfortunately they were diverted into the Bohemia River and it was after 8 a.m. before they reached their destination only to discover that the Americans had erected a six-gun battery. The battery fired on the boats as soon as they appeared, but the boats' carronades soon silenced it. The British burned stores, which consisted mainly of cavalry equipment, and five vessels.

Later the same morning Captain Lawrence embarked a number of cows after giving the owner bills on the Victualling Officer. He then rejoined Rear-Admiral Cockburn in Maidstone off the mouth of the Susquehanna River at the northern end of the Bay. After observing the Americans firing from  hoisting an American flag at a newly constructed battery at Havre de Grace, the Admiral determined to attack it. Captain Lawrence commanded the operation. At dawn on 2 May boats containing 150 marines, and a small party of artillerymen attacked, drove off the defenders and captured the battery.

A division of boats then rowed upriver to the Cecil or Principio Foundry, three or four miles to the north. They destroyed the buildings, machinery and guns they found there, as well as five vessels and a large store of flour. They returned to the ships by 10 p.m. after being away for twenty-two hours. The only casualty was Lieutenant Westphal, first of the Marlborough, who had received a shot through the hand. The gallantry, zeal and attention of Captain Lawrence was particularly mentioned in the Admiral's official letter, as was the behaviour of Lieutenant Reed of Fantome.

On 29 April, boats from Dolphin, Dragon, Fantome, Highflyer, Maidstone, Marlborough, Mohawk, Racer and Statira went up the Elk River in Chesapeake Bay under the personal command of Rear-Admiral Sir George Cockburn. Their objective was to destroy five American ships and stores, and by some accounts, a cannon foundry at French Town. This took until 3 May 1813 to complete. On the way, after a battery at Havre de Grace fired on them from the shore, a landing party destroyed the battery and burned much of the town. In 1847 the Admiralty authorized the issue of the Naval General Service Medal with clasp "April & May Boat Service 1813" to any surviving claimants from the action; the Navy issued 48 clasps.

On 30 April Highflyer supported Fantome and Mohawks boats when the vessels gathered cattle for the fleet's use, paying with bills on the Victualling Office. The next day, the vessels secured more cattle from Spesutie (Spesucie) Island just south of Havre de Grace.

On 29 April Fantome recaptured the English brig Endeavour of 110 tons and six men which an American privateer had captured while Endeavour was carrying wine from Guernsey to Gibraltar. The recaptured Endeavour reached Bermuda at the end of June.

Fantome was among the vessels that shared in the capture on 18 May of Pilgrim, of 269 tons (bm), J.W.Baker. Pilgrim had been sailing from New Orleans to Cadiz.

Fantome shared in the proceeds of the capture of Rolla and cargo on 29 May.

Rescue of American slaves
While operating in the Chesapeake, Fantome rescued a number of families of enslaved African Americans who had escaped from plantations as part of the Black Refugee migration in the War of 1812. Fantome gave sanctuary to seven escaped slaves on 30 May 1813 who then joined Fantomes crew. Two of them used Fantome as a base from which to return to shore and rescue enslaved wives and children.

Further captures 
Fantome was among the vessels sharing in the proceeds of the Spanish brig St. Iago and cargo captured on 11 June, and the American schooner Surveyor captured the next day. The same ships shared in the compromise for the American ships Governor Strong and cargo (12 June), Emily and cargo (12 June), and Star and cargo (14 June). The vessels that had shared the capture of Rolla also shared the capture of Protectress on 18 June. Lastly, she was among the vessels sharing in the proceeds of the American ship Herman and cargo (21 June). On 26 June Fantome captured Cida de de Leira, J.J. Claudio, master. Cida, a brig of 230 tons (bm), had been sailing from Lisbon to Boston when she was captured. she was carrying wool, salt, wine, juniper berries, and 23 Merino sheep.</ref>

Fantome recaptured the brig Seaflower, G.Atkinson, master, on 9 July.

Fantome also recaptured an unnamed brig that had been sailing from Newfoundland to Barbados.

On 5 October Fantome and  recaptured off Mount Desert Island, Maine, the former Nova Scotian privateer Liverpool Packet, then sailing as an American privateer under the name Portsmouth Packet, after a chase of 13 hours. At the time of her capture, Portsmouth Packet was armed with five guns, carried a crew of 45, and had sailed from Portsmouth, New Hampshire the previous day. She was a schooner of 55 tons (bm), under the command of Captain David Perkins. The recaptured schooner was brought into Halifax on 12 October. There her original owners repurchased her and restored the name of Liverpool Packet.

Almost a month later, on 3 November, Epervier  and Fantome captured Peggy, of 91 tons (bm), W. O. Fuller, master. she had been sailing from George's River to Boston with a cargo of timber and wood.

Captain Lawrence was made a Companion of the Bath for his services. In November 1813 Fantome came under the command of Commander Thomas Sykes.

Canadian trek 
Seventy men left Halifax in Fantome on 22 January for Saint John, New Brunswick, then travelled with sleighs to Fredericton, a distance of 80 miles. From there they travelled along the ice of the Saint John River. After eighty-two miles, at Presque Isle, they exchanged sleighs for toboggans, and were supplied with snowshoes and moccasins. Leaving on 8 February they made between 15 and 22 miles a day through knee-deep snow along the St. Lawrence, reaching Quebec on the 28th, taking shelter in the frigate  and the sloop Indian, frozen up in Wolfe's Cove. They finally reached Kingston, Ontario, on 22 March. A few days later Lieutenant Kent joined the 42-gun frigate .

On 9 May 1814 Fantome captured the Spanish brig Danzic. The brig Dantzic, J.Reid, master, was sailing from Bath to Bermuda with a cargo of lumber, boards, staves, and shingles. She was sent into St Johns, New Brunswick.

Loss

Fantome ran aground in Shad Bay near the village of Prospect, Nova Scotia, on 24 November 1814.  The brig was escorting a convoy from British-occupied Castine, Maine to Halifax, Nova Scotia. On the evening of 23 November Sykes ordered that a course be set for the Sambro Light. At 2am the next morning he ordered a depth sounding and when it showed only 35 fathoms, ordered a change of course. An hour later, when he came back on deck he discovered that the pilot had countermanded his order. Soon after she struck. Sykes had the masts cut away and the boats hoisted over the sides, but Fantome rapidly filled with water. The crew took to the boats in an orderly manner and all reached the shore safely.

The subsequent court martial reprimanded Sykes for failing to order frequent soundings and for relying too much on the pilot. It ordered Lieutenant John Fisher, the officer of the watch, to be more careful in the future, especially in keeping the captain aware of his ship's situation. It severely reprimanded the master, Joseph Forster, for not taking continuous sounding and for not informing the captain about his reservations concerning the course being steered. Lastly, the court martial severely reprimanded the pilot, Thomas Robinson, for countermanding the captain's order, and for sailing too close to the shore and without taking soundings. It ordered the pilot to lose all pay due him.

Two schooners from the convoy, Industry and Perseverance, were lost at the same location. A transport brig from the convoy went aground elsewhere on the same night but was got off later. There were no deaths when the ships sank.

Post-script
Some treasure hunters have claimed the convoy that Fantome was escorting was laden with goods taken from the White House during the British raid on Washington, DC. However Fantome played no part in the Washington raid and historians agree that the convoy was carrying goods and customs revenue from Castine. The site of Fantome's loss is marked today by an inscription on a large granite boulder near the wreck site at Prospect.

Notes

Citations

References

 

 

Young, G.F.W. "HMS Fantome and the British Raid on Washington August 1814", Royal Nova Scotia Historical Society Journal Vol. 10 (2007), pp. 132–145.

External links

War of 1812 ships of Canada
War of 1812 ships of the United Kingdom
Shipwrecks of the Nova Scotia coast
Maritime incidents in 1814
Privateer ships of France